Tofta may refer to:

 Tofta, Adelsö, a seat farm and manorial lordship in Uppland, Sweden
 Tofta, Gotland, a locality on the island of Gotland, Sweden
 Tofta firing range, a military training ground in Tofta on the Swedish island of Gotland
 Tofta, Varberg Municipality, a locality in Halland County, Sweden
 Tofta Leikvøllur, a multi-purpose stadium in Toftir, Faroe Islands
 Tofta, Landskrona Municipality, a district in Skåne County, Sweden